Hainer is a surname. Notable people with the surname include:

 Bayard T. Hainer (1860–1933), American jurist
 Eugene Jerome Hainer (1851–1929), American politician 
 Herbert Hainer (born 1954), German business manager

See also
 Hainer See, a lake in Germany
 Haines (surname)